Josephine Pon  is a Canadian politician who was elected in the 2019 Alberta general election to represent the electoral district of Calgary-Beddington in the 30th Alberta Legislature. She is a member of the United Conservative Party. On April 30, 2019, she was appointed to be the Minister of Seniors and Housing in the Executive Council of Alberta.

Background 
Pon was born in Hong Kong. She immigrated to Alberta, Canada in 1981, living her following years in Edmonton then eventually in Calgary with a career in banking before pursuing her political career. According to election promotion material from the 2019 Alberta provincial election, Pon worked in banking for over 20 years, in roles such as Account Manager in Personal/Commercial banking and Regional Manager, Business Development responsible for Multicultural Banking in the Prairie Region with Scotiabank working with more than 230 branches as well as 3,000 staff in and around the Prairie Region. Between 2013 and 2016 she was the chair of the board of directors for Immigrant Services Calgary (ISC) helping over 27,000 immigrants over 50 programs each year. She also worked at Canada Mortgage and Housing Corporation (CMHC), a crown corporation in mortgage insurance, as an International Trade Consultant as well as in the Assisted Housing department in the Prairie Region. Shortly before the election, she was Vice President of the Taste of Asia Group, which comprises five restaurants in Canada and well over 150 employees, claiming to assist in providing insight to the reality of the economic situation involving business and restaurant owners. On July 29, 2017 Josephine Pon was introduced as a part of Jason Kenney's Conservative Party leadership announcement.

Political life 
On April 16, 2019, Pon was elected as the United Conservative Party MLA for Calgary-Beddington. Shortly after the election, Premier Jason Kenney appointed her as Alberta's Minister of Seniors and Housing, vowing to ensure that Albertans and seniors have access to affordable housing and have the resources they need. Since her appointment, she has worked on reforming conventional methods of application and management of provincial benefits such as mailing, faxing or dropping-off to a more senior friendly digital option. She has also made efforts to advance housing projects in Alberta, saying "Investing in affordable housing is vital to helping more low-income Albertans get on the path to financial stability."

Pon announced her affordable housing plan on Nov. 21, 2019, as a way to reduce red tape for Albertan applicants. On November 1, 2021, Pon announced the tabling of Bill 78: The Alberta Housing Amendment Act, which will allow the government to enter into "joint ventures" with for profit private companies in an effort to attract more investment to expand and improve affordable housing.

As part of a partnership with the federal Government of Canada, Pon announced a $444 million investment to fund rent support for nearly 35,500 households in Alberta.

Electoral record

References

United Conservative Party MLAs
Living people
Women MLAs in Alberta
Canadian bankers
Hong Kong emigrants to Canada
Members of the Executive Council of Alberta
Politicians from Calgary
Women government ministers of Canada
21st-century Canadian politicians
21st-century Canadian women politicians
Year of birth missing (living people)